Catherine Blake (1762–1831) was the wife and assistant of William Blake.

Catherine Blake or similar may also refer to:

People
Catherine C. Blake (born 1950), United States federal judge
Katharine Blake (actress) (1921–1991), South African actress
Katharine Blake (singer) (born 1970), British musician
Dorothy J. Heydt, American author, pen name Katherine Blake
Katherine Devereux Blake (1858–1950), American educator, peace and women's rights activist
 Catherine Blake (née Wright), mother of William Blake

Fictional entities
Katherine Blake (character), killer on the soap opera Shortland Street

See also
Katarina Eriksdotter (12th-century), Swedish princess, married to Nils Blake